Legendary Assassin is a 2008 Hong Kong action film directed by Wu Jing in his directorial debut, who also starred in the lead role, and also features fight choreography by Nicky Li. The film also marks the screen debut of singer, songwriter and model Celina Jade (daughter of Snake in the Eagle's Shadow and Game of Death II film star Roy Horan). Wu stars as a mysterious martial artist, who become a female cop's prime suspect in a murder investigation.

Cast
 Wu Jing as Bo, a mysterious martial arts expert whose warmth is masked behind his chilly facade.
 Celina Jade as Holly, a small-time cop stationed on an outlying island.
 Hui Shiu-hung as Grant Gong, a veteran cop on the outlying island, who is a father figure to Holly.
 Alex Fong Lik-Sun as Handson, a narcissistic cop.
 Sammy Leung as Tarzan, the lowest-ranking cop on the island, who uses his arrogance to hide his inferiority complex.
 Ronald Cheng as Uncle Fung Chi-Keung, an eccentric, restaurant owner.
 Kou Zhan Wen as Chairman Timothy Ma, a ruthless crime boss and the world's most wanted criminal. Kou and Wu Jing grew up together as members of Beijing Wushu Team and Wu considered Kou as his senior.
 Noriko Aoyama as Madam Ma, the wife of Chairman Ma, who eventually takes over her husband's organization.
 Lam Suet as Fat Wing
 Mark Cheng as Commissioner Yu
 Ken Lo as Head of Robbers
 Jiang Bao-Cheng as Robber
 Chen Xin-Qiang as Robber
 Hau Woon-Ling as Maggie

Production
Legendary Assassin marks the directorial debuts of Wu Jing and Nicky Li. Wu Jing had long wished to become a director since he first stepped into the entertainment industry in 1995. Nicky Li, a former fight choreography and stunt member of the Jackie Chan Stunt Team, had collaborated with on several recent projects which include Fatal Contact and Invisible Target. The film was shot with a budget of HK$30 million in Hong Kong. Filming began in March, went on a hiatus by the middle of May and resumed towards end of July, wrapping up filming in September.

References

External links
 
 
 
 Legendary Assassin at Hong Kong Movie DataBase
 Legendary Assassin at Hong Kong Cinemagic

2008 films
2008 action thriller films
2008 martial arts films
Hong Kong martial arts films
Hong Kong action thriller films
2000s Cantonese-language films
Wushu films
Hong Kong films about revenge
Films set in Hong Kong
Films shot in Hong Kong
Films set on islands
Films directed by Wu Jing (actor)
2008 directorial debut films
2000s Hong Kong films